Trox affinis is a beetle of the family Trogidae.

References 

affinis
Beetles described in 1940